Slang in Hong Kong evolves over time, and mainly comprises Cantonese, English, or a combination of the two.

Introduction

The word slanguage consists of two original English words, slang and language. ‘Slang’ means informal usage in vocabulary and idioms that is characteristically more metaphorical, while ‘Language’ means a body of words in which people who are of the same culture, community or nation share the system.

Hong Kong slanguage consists of commonly used terms or trendy expressions in Hong Kong which are in Cantonese only. This type of language is used both in written and spoken words. As Hong Kong slanguage mainly consists of trendy expressions that are commonly used in the Internet and other social medias, it broadly represents the culture or social issues which take place in a certain period of time. Therefore, Hong Kong slanguage usually changes with time and some words would be eliminated over time. Due to usage of non-standard words or phrases, Hong Kong slanguage is still relatively less accepted and understood by Cantonese speakers.

History

The rise of local slanguage is a social phenomenon in Hong Kong. In Hong Kong, there are approximately 5400000 active Internet users. This immense number of Internet users apparently gives an impetus to the evolution of Hong Kong online forums and the birth of Hong Kong slanguage.

The trend started with the development of local online forums. The two dominating online forums in Hong Kong, HK Golden Forum and HK Discuss Forum, were found in 2000 and 2003 respectively. As the number of Hong Kong forum users gradually increased, members of younger generation found typing formal Chinese words and sentences on the Internet to be old-fashioned, developing distinct and innovative online buzzwords.

In the beginning, those words were exclusively used on online forums and amongst younger Internet users. Unexpectedly, some new phrases spread extensively, becoming commonplace, not only amongst Hong Kong teenagers, but also enjoying use widespread use among Hong Kong adults and in the media. Some of these new terms are now widely accepted by the public and are classified as ‘Hong Kong slanguage’.

In 2008 Hong Kong Certificate of Education Examination, local slanguage was included in the questions by the Hong Kong Examinations and Assessment Authority in Chinese paper five. In 2009, a form-three student was found using slang terms in the Territory-wide System Assessment. Hong Kong slanguage has had a broad impact in the lives of Hongkongese people, far outreaching its Internet origins.

Examples

There are several examples of the usage of slanguage. (Note: English romanization for terms below uses the Jyutping system).

Appellation 
1. Aa3 caa1 - South Asian especially, Indian and Pakistanis. 
 In British Hong Kong era, there were many British Indian serving for police officers (in Cantonese, 差人) in Hong Kong.

2. Buk6 gaai1 - Sound like the English words “Poor Guy”; Villain or someone deserves to die.

3. Caa1 lou2, Caa1 po4 - Policemen and Policewomen respectively.

4. Gam1 so2 si4 - Literally means Golden key, Silver spoon (People who are born in rich family). 

5. Gwai2 lou2, Gwai2 po4, Gwai2 zai2, Gwai2 mui6 - referred to Gweilo; Caucasian men, Caucasian women, Caucasian boys and Caucasian girls respectively.

6. Ji6 ng5 zai2 - Literally means “Two” “Five” Son; Insurgent, rebel or traitor.

7. Maa1 daa2, Faa1 daa2, Baa1 daa2 and Si1 daa2 - Sound like the English words “Mother”, “Father”, “Brother” and “Sister” respectively; Mother, Father, Brother and Sister respectively.

8. Se4 wong4 - Literally means Snake King；Professional snake catchers.

9. Seoi2 jyu4 - Literally means Water fish; 1). - Turtle or Trionychidae. 2.) - Easy mark (Someone who is easily deceived, fooled or victimised).

10. Si1 naai5 (Alternatively, C nine) - Sound like the English words “C” “Nine”; Aunt, housewife or married woman.

11. Sik6 coi3 mai5 - Freeloader / Sponger. 

12. Sik6 ziu1 - Literally to eat banana and sound like the English word “Secure”; Security guard.

13. So-di-a-sm - Sound like the Cantonese words “掃地啊嬸” - An woman served for cleaning helper, janitor or custodian.

Business

Company 

1. Cat1 zai2 - Literally means “Seven” son; 7-Eleven.

2. Daai6 zau2 dim3 - Literally means Big hotel; 1.) - Hongkong and Shanghai Hotels. 2.) - Funeral home.

3. Gai1 gei3 - Etymology : 雞 (Chicken) + 記 (“meaningless suffix”); KFC restaurant.

4. M gei3 (Alternatively, Mak6 gei3 (Etymology : 麥 (Sound like Scottish prefix “Mc”) + 記 (“meaningless suffix”)) or Lou5 mak6 (Etymology : 老 (“meaningless prefix”) + 麥 (Sound like Scottish prefix “Mc”)) - McDonald's.

Business terminology 

1. Caau2 jau4 jyu4 - Literally to stir-fry a squid; Dismissal.

2. Daat3 deng6 - The seller forfeits buyer's deposit after the buyer failed to complete the deal.

3. Dan6 dung1 gu1 - Literally to simmer Shiitake Mushrooms; Demotion, this slang originated from Hong Kong Police Force in British Hong Kong era.

4. Fei4 gai1 caan1 - Literally means Fat Chicken Meal; Voluntary dismissal or early retirement scheme (Layoff).

5. Paak3 wu1 jing1 - Literally to swat flies; having a slack business.

6. Se3 bok3 (Alternatively, Se3 bo1) - Literally to unload shoulder (to unload ball); to bunk off or to deny or refuse responsibility.

7. Se4 wong4 - Literally means Snake King；1.) -  Absent Without Leave, skive off / slack off, sneak out or to be lazy during work. 2.）- Professional snake catchers.

Unit of Money  

1. Man1 - Literally means Mosquito; Dollor.
 Jat1 man1 = One dollar.

2. Cou2 - Literally means Grass; 10 Dollars.
 Jat1 cou2 je5 = Ten dollars.

3. Gau6 - Literally means Piece; 100 Dollars.
 Jat1 gau6 seoi2 = One hundred dollars.

4. Pei4, Lap1 or Pun4 - Literally means Skin, Granular, Basin or sink-shaped respectively; 10,000 Dollars.
 Jat1 pei4 je5 = Jat1 lap1 je5 = Jat1 pun4 seoi2 = Ten thousands dollars.

5. Kau4 - Literally means Ball; 1,000,000 Dollars.
 Jat1 kau4 = One million dollars.

6. Cing1 haai5 - Literally means Green crab; Hong Kong ten-dollar note (issued in 1982-85 by HSBC).

7. Faa1 haai5 - Flower crab; Hong Kong ten-dollar note (issued in 2002-2005 by Hong Kong government).

8. Gaau1 haai5 - Literally means Plastic crab; Hong Kong ten-dollar note (issued in 2007-2018 by Hong Kong government, made of polymer).

8. Hung4 saam1 jyu4 - Literally means Red clothes fish (Nemipterus virgatus); Hong Kong one hundred-dollar note (red colour).

9. Daai6 ngau4 - Literally means Big Buffalo; Hong Kong five hundred-dollar note.

10. Gam1 ngau4 - Literally means Golden Cow; Hong Kong one thousand-dollar note.

Criminal

Department 

1. Caa1 gun2 - Police station.

2. Lou5 lim4 - Etymology : 老 (“meaningless prefix”) + 廉 (廉潔 means incorruptible); ICAC.

3. Lau5 gei3 - Hong Kong Correctional Services Department (CSD).

4. O gei3 - Organised Crime and Triad Bureau (OCTB) of Hong Kong Police Force.

Criminal terminology 

1. Baak6 fan2 - Literally means White Powder; Heroin.

2. Baau3 gaak3 - Sound like English word, “burglar”; Burglary.

3. Ceot1 caak3 - Etymology : 出 (“means Exit”) + 冊 (Chinese character looks like jail frame);To be released from prison.

4. Ceot1 maau1 - Literally means Exiting cat; Cheating in examination.

5. Daa2 ho4 baau1 - Pickpocketing.

6. Deoi2 cou2 - Literally to take grass / weed; Cannabis smoking.

7. Gaam1 dan2 - Prisoner or ex-Prisoner.

8. Hoi1 pin3 - Literally to start filming; Gang fight with weapons. 

9. Jap6 caak3 - Etymology : 入 (“means Enter”) + 冊 (Chinese character looks like jail frame); To be imprisoned.

10. Leon4 daai6 mai5 - Literally to queue for rice; Gang rape.

11. Lou5 lap1 - Etymology : 老 (“meaningless prefix”) + 笠 (Sound like English word “rob”); Robbery.

12. Maa1 jip6 - Literally means Double leaves; Handcuffs.

13. Ngau4 juk6 gon1 - Literally means Dehydrated beef, Fixed penalty parking ticket. 

14. Sai2 tau4 teng5 - Literally means Shampoo boat; Illegal high-speed ferry, a sea transportation tool crossing border without official immigration procedure.
 Many Hong Kong people go to Mainland China and Mainlanders go to Hong Kong by Shampoo boats for illegal purposes like Absconding, false alibi, kidnapping, murder, prostitution / sex solicitation and robbery.

15. San1 jau5 si2 - Literally means Feces on the body; Skeleton in the closet.

16. Si1 piu3 - To Kill the kidnappee.

17. Sik6 sei2 maau1 - Literally to eat a dead cat; To be a Scapegoat.

18. Tiu3 fui1 (Alternatively, Zau2 fan2 (走粉)) - Literally means Jumping ash (Running powder); Drug trafficking, especially for Heroin.

19. Tong1 sei2 ngau4 - Literally to butcher a dead cow; To rob somebody in quiet place, especially in night time.

20. Zap1 si1 - Literally means collect or take a corpse; To rape drunk or unconscious female.

21. Zek3 zau1 - One-against-one fight.

22. Zoek3 cou2 - Literally to wear grass; To flee.

23. Zuk1 wong4 goek3 gai1 - Literally to catch yellow-foot chicken; Badger game.

Gun 

1. Kuk1 cek3 - Literally means Crooker ruler; Semi-automatic pistol.
  This gun looks like Try square (in Chinese, 曲尺).    

2. Zo2 leon2 - Literally means left wheel (gun); Revolver.

Foods and Drinks 

1. Baak6 tong1 - Literally means White soup; Chowder or Cream of mushroom soup. 

2. Daan2 daat3 - Egg tart.

3. Gai1 daan2 zai2 - Literally means Chicken egg son; Egg waffle.

4. Ho4 laan4 seoi2 - Literally means Dutch water; Carbonated water or Soft drink.

5. Hung4 tong1 - Literally means Red soup; Borscht.

6. Min5 zi6 - Sound like the English word “Mince”; Mincing.

7. Ngai2 gwaa1 - Literally means Short melon; Aubergine (Eggplant).

8. Waan5 jyu4 - Grass carp.

Steak cooking levels 

1. Jat1 sing4 suk6 - Literally means 10% cooked; Rare.

2. Saam1 sing4 suk6 - Literally means 30% cooked; Medium rare.

3. Ng5 sing4 suk6 - Literally means 50% cooked; Medium.

4. Cat1 sing4 suk6 - Literally means 70% cooked; Medium well.

5. Cyun4 suk6 - Literally means fully cooked; Well done.

Foul language 

1. Buk6 gaai1 - 1.) - As Adverb, similar meaning as English words Oh my god, Oh shit or What the fuck. 2.) - As Noun, sound like the English words “Poor Guy”; Villain or someone deserves to die.

2. Diu2 - Fuck.

3. Ham6 gaa1 caan2 - Literally means Whole family die; Common curse phrase for someone's whole family being death and bulldozed.

4. Jaa1 ziu1 - Literally to eat banana; a vulgar way of expressing hostility and strong irritation, "Piss off!"

5. Saap3 ngong6 / - (of a decision) Stupid, Ignorant or Ridiculous.

6. Sau1 pei4 - Literally to collect skin; Knock it off, similar meaning as 吔蕉 in slang.

7. Sik6 ziu1 - 1.) - Literally to eat banana, same as 吔蕉. 2.) - Sound like the English word “Secure”; Security guard.

Love and Sex 

1. Ce2 kei4 - Literally to raise a flag; Penile erection.

2. Ceoi1 siu1 - Literally to play Xiao; Women performing Oral sex for men.

3. Daa2 fei1 gei1 - Literally to shutdown an aeroplane; Male Masturbation.

4. Din6 dang1 daam2 - Literally means Light bulb; Third wheel.

5. Gai1 - Literally means Chicken; Female sex worker.

6. Maai6 fei1 fat6 - Sound like English words “My favorite”; My favorite, this slang originated from Ron Ng's Hong Kong English. 

7. Ngaap3 - Literally means Duck; Male prostitution or Gigolo.

8. Sei3 zai2 - Literally means “Four” son; Pornographic films.
 In Hong Kong, blue movies or pornographic films are categorized as category III films. 四仔 (Category IV) means that the films are more pornographic than Category III films. 

9. Sik6 yun5 faan6 (Alternatively, Sik6 to1 haai2 faan6) - Literally to eat soft rice (to eat slippers' rice); To sponge off women.

10. Taat3 zoek3 - Literally to ignite a fire; two people fall in love and become a couple.

11. Tau1 sik6 - Literally to sneak food; Adultery, Infidelity or Two-time.

12. Zuk1 wong4 goek3 gai1 (捉黃腳雞) - Literally to catch yellow-foot chicken; Badger game.

Medical 

1. Baau3 gong1 / - Literally to rupture a river / crock; Bleeding.

2. Daap3 kiu4 - Literally to build a bridge; Coronary Artery Bypass Grafting (CABG).

3. Hei2 gai1 pei4 - Literally to raise chicken skin; To get Goose bumps.

4. Tung1 bo1 zai2 - Literally to make something smooth by a small ball; Angioplasty.

5. Wong4 luk6 ji1 saang1 - Literally means Yellow green doctor / Yellow six doctor; Quackery.

Professional 

1. Jin3 so1 - Literally means Swallow and Comb, sound like the English word “Insure”; Insurance.

2. Laan6 mei5 lau4 - Literally means Tail-rotten building; Unfinished building.

3. Ngan4 zyu2 pun4 - Foreclosure, mainly in Real Estate, like apartments and houses.

4. Sek6 si2 - Literally means Stone and Feces; Concrete.

Sports

Football 

1. Bo1 - Literally means Wave, but sound like the English word “Ball”; Ball or Football.

2. Caap3 faa1 - Literally means Flower bouquet; Step over.

3. Caau2 gaai3 laan4 - Literally to stir-fry Chinese broccoli; A football player get injuried of thigh tendons or muscle by crashing someone's kneel leg or hard body.

4. Jin3 haak3 - Literally to hold a banquet; To miss a penalty.

5. Sik6 bo1 beng2 - Literally to eat ball biscuit; Someone's head or face gets hit by football.

6. Tung1 haang1 keoi4 - Literally to unblock sewer pipes or clogged wastewater drain; Nutmeg. 

7. Wo1 lei6 - Sound like the English word “Volley”; Volley.

Non-football 

1. Caai2 roller - 踩 means Step on; Playing roller skating. 

2. Duk1 bo1 - Playing snooker.

3. Luk1 ling4 / / - 轆 /  means Wheel (as noun) or Roll (as verb), 拎 / 齡 sound like English word lane; Playing bowling (in Chinese,  保“齡”球).

Others 

1. He3 / - 𠺪, Literally means slovenly; To describe someone who stroll around without any purpose and heedless of everything.
 In Cantonese, 𠺪 / hea has the similar meaning as 躺平 in Standard Chinese and Goblin mode in English.

2. Fong3 fei1 gei1 - Literally to fly an aeroplane; To fail to turn up on a date / To stand somebody up.

3. Sap6 buk1 - Sound like the English word “Support”; To cheer someone up.

4. Fu6 luk1 - Sound like the English word “Fluke”; meaning something that is unlikely or surprising and only happens because of luck.

5. O jeui2 (Alternatively, Dit3 ngaan5 geng3) - Literally to have an O shaped mouth (to drop glasses); To feel astonished and stunned, meaning 'oh my gosh'. The jaw drops and the shape of the mouth resembles the English letter, O.

6. Chyun3 jeui2 - To behave arrogantly and rudely.

7. Wat1 gei1 - Literally to break a machine into two pieces; an adjective describing someone who is tremendous and excellent.

8. Sing1 ne1 / - To gain a higher level in video game or Promotion.

9. Baan6 haai5 - To behave pretentiously.

10. Pan3 faan6 - Literally meaning is "spitting rice"; something makes you burst into laughter.

11. Dik6 hon6 - Literally to sweat; to feel speechless and reticent.

12. Gwai1 cuk1 - Literally means turtle speed; extremely slow speed.

13. Cim4 seoi2 - Literally means underwater diving; to disappear or Lurker. 

14. Laang5 hei3 gwan1 si1 - Literally means an adviser inside an air-conditioning room; Armchair expert or Keyboard warrior.

15. Zau2 sou3 - Literally means to run away from one's debts; to chicken out or failing to keep promise.

16. Daa2 zim1 / - Cutting in line.

17. Ceoi1 seoi2 - Literally to blow water; Chit-chatting.

18. Ding2 nei5 m4 seon6 - You make me sick!

19. Gaau2 cyun3 go3 party - Party pooping.

20. Lau1 daa2 (Alternatively, Liu4 gaau1 daa2) - To make someone angry and provoke someone for fighting.

21. Diu3 jyu4 - Literally to fish; To nod off / drift off / doze off.

22. Tip1 si2 - Sound like the English word “Tips”; 1). - Hints (Tips). 2). - Gratuity (Tip).

23. Gei2 daai2 (Alternatively, Hou2 daai2) - As Adverb, Whatever.

24. Mou4 laa1 laa1 - As Adverb, Out of the blue.

25. Pou4 tau4 - To appear.

Relationship with Cantonese and Culture

From the aspect of linguistics, the lexicon of Hong Kong slanguage can be classified into three types, including compounds, simple words and accessional words. Over 80% of 237 Hong Kong slang words consist of compound, a word with more than one radical element, which indicates that Cantonese slangs are usually composed by the existing words. Aforementioned examples such as Fong Fei Gei, Cyun Zoei() and Wat Gei() are all compounds, while Hea, Sap buk, Fu Luk are simple words, which cannot be broken down into different words and O jui is accessional word.

Cantonese has an array of unique features and the classification in usage of Cantonese is particular. The components of a Chinese word relate to each other compactly. For instance, radicals in Chinese symbolize various gestures and actions. It paves a way for Cantonese to possess strong expressiveness. Therefore, people nurture and create slanguage in Cantonese easily. Some words simply do not exist in other Chinese dialects. For example, there is no formal Chinese character for jiu, which is verbal Cantonese for chew in which the word is simply made up by Hong Kong people.

Teenagers, being the most innovative and dynamic language users in a society, create new terms frequently. The younger generation is probably more responsible for spreading slangs directly because they are much more susceptible to the world of television comedies, commercials, comic strips and so on. This explains why a large portion of slang expressions originate and spread out from youth communities. It also states that slanguage is not only for communication, but also for recording the current culture. Thus, through the wide acceptance of Hong Kong slanguage, the culture of Hong Kong teenagers and perhaps even the entire society can be realized.

See also
 Cantonese profanity
 Cantonese slang
 Code-switching in Hong Kong

References

Culture of Hong Kong
Slang by country